Ivan "Ivo" Brešan (27 May 1936 – 3 January 2017) was a Croatian and Yugoslav playwright, novelist and screenwriter, known for political satire. His work included screenplays written with his son Vinko.

Personal life
Born in Vodice 1936, Brešan attended Antun Vrančić High School in Šibenik. He was married Croatian writer Jelena Godlar, a Jew of Slavonia native. In February 1964, she gave to birth their son Vinko, today a film director. Ivo's wife Jelena died on 20 September 2016. He died after long and severe illness, on 3 January 2017 in Zagreb, aged 80.

Screenplays
 1973 – Predstava Hamleta u selu Mrduša Donja
 1976 – Izbavitelj
 1980 – The Secret of Nikola Tesla
 1986 – Obećana zemlja
 1989 – Donator
 1996 – How the War Started on My Island
 2000 – Marshal Tito's Spirit
 2004 – Libertas

References

External links
 
 Ivo Brešan at film.hr

1936 births
2017 deaths
Croatian novelists
Croatian male writers
Croatian dramatists and playwrights
Croatian screenwriters
Croatian satirists
Golden Arena winners
Male novelists
Vladimir Nazor Award winners